The Heart of Doreon (also known as In the Heart of Doreon and misspelled as The Heart of Dorean) is a 1921 American silent short Western romantic drama film produced by Cyrus J. Williams and distributed by Pathé Exchange. It was directed by Robert North Bradbury and stars Tom Santschi and Ruth Stonehouse.

This short film was part of the "Santschi Series", which included the other short films The Honor of Rameriz, The Spirit of the Lake, Lorraine of the Timberlands, and Mother o' Dreams, all of which starred Santschi.

An 8-minute version of the film survives, which has been released by Harpodeon.

Plot 
French Canadian woodsman Doreon (Santschi) is in love with Babette (Stonehouse), but she is in love with Blake (Hearn). After a fight, Doreon mistakenly believes that he has killed Blake. He later learns that Blake has survived but is wanted for murder. Doreon helps the Royal Canadian Mounted Police capture Blake, and Babette falls in love with Doreon.

Cast 
 Tom Santschi as Doreon
 Ruth Stonehouse as Babette
 Edward Hearn as Blake
 Jay Morley

Production 
Exteriors were filmed in the San Jacinto Mountains.

Reception 
The film was noted for its "beautiful outdoor scenes."

References

External links 
 

1921 films
American black-and-white films
Films set in Canada
Royal Canadian Mounted Police in fiction